LaMar Hasbrouck (born 31 October, 1965) is an African-American physician, CDC-trained medical epidemiologist, and public health leader. Hasbrouck is the former executive director for the National Association of County and City Health Officials, and former director of the Illinois Department of Public Health and State Health Officer for Illinois. He is a health policy contributing writer for The Hill, recurrent guest on CNN, former host of AMA Doc Talk, a podcast by the American Medical Association and managing Director for DLM LLC, a health consulting firm.

Early life and education 
Hasbrouck grew up San Diego, California and attended Will C. Crawford High School. He completed his Bachelor of Arts degree from the University of California, Berkeley (1988) and his Master of Public Health degree from UC Berkeley School of Public Health (1990). In 1994, Hasbrouck earned a Doctor of Medicine degree from the David Geffen School of Medicine at UCLA and Charles R. Drew University of Medicine and Science joint program. He won the Charles Donald O’Malley Prize in Medical History and was recognized as Dean’s Scholar for his medical thesis titled, “The Flexner Report of 1910 and the well-being of Black Americans: historical underpinnings of a contemporary health crisis”. Hasbrouck completed his residency in internal medicine at the Weill Cornell Medical Center New York-Presbyterian Hospital from 1994 to 1997. He was a founding member, and inaugural chair, of the Minority House Staff Committee, established in 1995 to increase the number of residents who are traditionally underrepresented in internal medicine. In 2012, Hasbrouck completed the Harvard Kennedy School program for Senior Executives in State and Local Government. He earned his MBA with a concentration in leadership and organizational health from the University of Saint Mary in 2019.

Career

Centers for Disease Control and Prevention
Hasbrouck began his career at the Centers for Disease Control in 1998 as a select member of the Epidemic Intelligence Service (EIS), known colloquially as “disease detectives.” From 2000 – 2003, Hasbrouck was a medical officer with the National Center for Injury and Prevention Control and was the primary CDC scientist and contributing writer for the Surgeon General’s Report on Youth Violence (2001). He was actively engaged in two of the largest global health initiatives in history: the World Health Organization’s polio eradication program; and, the US President’s Emergency Plan for AIDS Relief. He was a short-term consultant for the World Health Organization as a member of the CDC Stop Transmission of Polio (STOP) program assigned to Bangladesh. From 2004 to 2007, Hasbrouck was a senior medical officer with the Division of Global HIV/AIDS. He supported the President’s Emergency Plan for AIDS Relief (PEPFAR) programs in Namibia, Nigeria, and Haiti. In October 2007, Hasbrouck was appointed Chief of Party for CDC in Guyana, South America. As a diplomat member of the US Embassy from 2007 to 2009, Hasbrouck led the PEPFAR program, oversaw completion of the National Public Health Reference Laboratory and helped to coordinate the humanitarian and civic assistance mission by the USS Kearsarge as a part of Operation Continuing Promise in 2008.

Health Director of Ulster County, NY
From 2009 to 2012, Hasbrouck was director of the Ulster County, New York Department of Health where he promoted programs to address health disparities, directing resources to most vulnerable populations and high consumers of healthcare. In 2010, County Executive Mike Hein appointed Hasbrouck Commissioner of the Department of Mental Hygiene. Hasbrouck led the merger of both departments into the Department of Health and Mental Health and was the only county official in the state of New York to simultaneously lead both the health and mental health departments.

Health Director of Illinois
In 2012, Governor Pat Quinn nominated Hasbrouck to be the Director of the Illinois Department of Public Health. He was confirmed by the Illinois Senate on May 17, 2012, as the 17th Director for one of the state’s oldest agencies, first organized in 1877. From 2012 to 2015, Hasbrouck was a member of the Governor’s Health Innovation and Transformation (GOHIT) team responsible for implementing the Affordable Care Act, expanded Medicaid coverage, and other reforms throughout the state. Hasbrouck directed statewide responses to several flu outbreaks, the Middle East respiratory syndrome (MERS), and was co-chair for the state’s Ebola Task Force. Hasbrouck stepped down in early 2015 after Governor Quinn’s reelection loss.

National Association of County and City Health Officials
From 2015 to 2017, Hasbrouck was the executive director for the National Association of County and City Health Officials (NACCHO), the Washington, DC-based organization representing nearly 3,000 local public health departments in the U.S.. He represented the voice of local public health on national issues of critical importance. Hasbrouck fought to increase federal funding for public health infrastructure, emergency preparedness, and Zika virus. He advocated for advancing science to improve population health and healthcare reform. After leaving NACCHO, Hasbrouck founded DLM LLC, a consulting firm that collaborates with organizations to bend the arc of wellness for defined populations.

He remained a Senior Advisor for Population Health at the Saudi Arabian Council of Cooperative Health Insurance. He also remained the Senior Advisor for Strategy and Growth with the American Medical Association, where he developed strategies to eliminate gaps in chronic disease prevention such as pre-diabetes and hypertension. He has held faculty positions at Emory University School of Medicine, Morehouse School of Medicine, and the University of Illinois at Chicago School of Public Health.

COVID-19 Pandemic
Hasbrouck leverages his background in medicine, epidemiology, public health, and health policy and provides expert insights to print, broadcast, and digital media, including CNN, USA Today, Chicago Tribune. Hasbrouck authored the book COVID Bytes: Musings of a Disease Detective based on his popular blog containing real-time, science-informed, witty critique of the first 12 months of the pandemic. He serves as a spokesperson for public health issues, including the ACA. He spoke at the Saudi Vision 2030 and HIMSS21 Middle East.

Awards and honors 
 2016: Top Blacks in Healthcare Award, BlackDoctor.org & Johns Hopkins Center for Health Disparities Solutions, 2016
 2015: Weill Cornell Medicine Notable Alumni, 2015
 2010: United States Public Health Service, Outstanding Unit Citation (H1N1 pandemic), 2010
 2009: United States Department of State, Meritorious Honor Award, 2009
 2007: United States Public Health Service, Outstanding Unit Citation (PEPFAR), 2007
 2004: United States Public Health Service, Outstanding Unit Citation (smallpox vaccination program), 2004
 2002: United States Public Health Service, Foreign Duty Service Award (polio eradication program), 2002
 2000: United States Department of Health and Human Services, Secretary’s Award for Distinguished Service, 2000

Publications 
 Hasbrouck L. G Street Lion: Stalking a Dream (iUniverse, 2016).
 Three steps organizations can take to address health disparities. Medical Marketing and Media. September 3, 2020.
 "Commentary: Governor Pritzker has the right idea, but a vaccine will not save us." Chicago Tribune. May 6, 2020.
 "Returning to business after COVID-19" The Hill. April 24, 2020.
 "Revamped Obamacare threatens to throw out baby with bathwater." The Hill. March 14, 2017
 Emergency medical response program threatened by federal budget cuts
 Yeager VA, Beitsch LM, Hasbrouck L. (May–June 2016) "A mismatch between the educational pipeline and public health workforce: can it be reconciled?" Public Health Reports, 131:507-509
 "Time for a counterattack on superbugs that kill thousands." The Hill. August 18, 2015
 Americans endangered by cuts to local health departments
 Hasbrouck L, Potter L, Mercy JA, Andre M. (2001) "Influence of homicide on racial disparity in life expectancy, United States, 1998." Morbidity and Mortality Weekly Report 50 (36):780-3.

Personal life 
Hasbrouck is a dedicated father of three young adult daughters. He is a former NCAA Division I collegiate athlete and track and field enthusiast. He is a USATF Masters All-American sprinter ranked 8th nationally in the 100-meter hurdles in 2018 and the 2022 Masters Indoor Champion in the 60-meter hurdles. He currently trains and lives in Chicago.

References 

Living people
1965 births